Balta notulata, also known by the common name small-spotted cockroach, is a species from the genus Balta.

References

Blattodea
Cockroaches